Abdel Fattah Yahya Pasha (1876–1951) was an Egyptian political figure. He served as Prime Minister of Egypt from 1933 to 1934.

He was Justice Minister in 1921 and 1930, and from 1930 to 1934 was Minister for Foreign Affairs. Though King Fuad I asked him to serve as Prime Minister from 1933 to 1934, he did not prove successful at leading the government in the face of popular opposition to the king. Elected a Senator in 1936, he proved more successful at chairing the Senate. He served on the delegation negotiating the 1936 Anglo-Egyptian Treaty, and was among Egypt's representatives at the 1945 United Nations Conference on International Organization.

References

External links

1876 births
1951 deaths
19th-century Egyptian people
20th-century prime ministers of Egypt
Prime Ministers of Egypt
Foreign ministers of Egypt
Egyptian pashas
Justice ministers of Egypt